A traumatic brain injury (TBI) is a blow, jolt or penetration to the head that disrupts the function of the brain. Most TBIs are caused by falls, jumps, motor vehicle traffic crashes, being struck by a person or a blunt object, and assault. Student-athletes may be put at risk in school sports, creating concern about concussions and brain injury. A concussion can be caused by a direct blow to the head, or an indirect blow to the body that causes reactions in the brain. The result of a concussion is neurological impairment that may resolve spontaneously but may also have long-term consequences.

Background

Many teens engage in extracurricular activities including sports that can pose risk of injury. Some sports that create a more significant risk of a head injury or concussion include basketball, cheerleading, soccer, and football.

High school football accounts for a significant percentage of head injuries that result from high school sports. While performing intense physical activity the brains' structure and functionality can be changed. This alteration in the brain may be a reason athletes in contact sports have concussions at higher. In combination with the contact and altered brain structure this can potentially lead to more severe concussions.

Effects 

The symptoms of concussion may be physical, cognitive and emotional in nature. Symptoms vary between affected individuals, and symptoms immediately or be delayed.

Short-term 
Possible signs of concussion that may appear in a student-athlete after a jolt to the head or body include:
a dazed appearance
confusion
forgetfulness
lack of confidence in actions
clumsiness
slower than normal
loss of consciousness
changes in mood, behavior, or personality, and
inability to remember events prior to, or after the hit
An injured student may report any of these signs as well as sensitivity to light or sound, double vision, a headache, or other abnormal feelings. A student who has been diagnosed with a concussion may become frustrated, impatient, and angry about the situation.

Long-term 
Concussions may have consequences that are not immediately apparent. Concussions can affect sleep quality and may cause sleep patterns to become inconsistent. Some nights an individual may sleep for an extended period of time whereas in others sleep time can be short. With acute concussions, sleep occurs for longer durations when compared to subacute. Concussions have also been shown to increase the risk for mental issues such as depression, CTE, dementia, and other cognitive issues (Guskiewicz et al., 2005).

Concussions may also have long term effects on the ability to learn and execute motor patterns. As compared to an individual with no concussions, due to damage to the brain resulting from concussion, a concussed individual may have reduced motor learning speeds and ability to progress in activity.

Response 

Proper care for a concussed player involves providing proper medical treatment and exclusion from practices and games until the individual is cleared to play by a qualified medical professional.

After a concussion, protocols for safe return to sports practice and competition involve gradual return to play with an appropriate level of medical supervision. To ensure player safety and reduce potential liability, school concussion plans should also have a formal system for tracking compliance, and for identifying and responding to any deviations from the plan's standards.

Prevention 
Formal concussion plans that include elements of education, prevention, recognition, evaluation and management, both reduce the chance of concussion and ensure that concussions are promptly diagnosed.

Prevention efforts in high school athletics may include:
 Conditioning, teaching and practice of techniques that reduce the chance of injury. For example, a football player who learns the proper way to tackle, spends time in the weight room, and maintains overall good health choices is more likely to avoid situations which put them in harm's way.
 Concussion response programs that take concussions seriously, limit the number of concussions a student may have while continuing to participate in a sport, and that monitor for recovery and residual effects of concussion.

Protective gear 
In the game of football pads and helmets are good tools but do not completely protect the player. The helmets worn in football defend against most head injuries. These injuries include things like brain bleeds, skull fractures, and possible jaw injuries. What the helmets do not protect against are mTBI or mild traumatic brain injury. This is where concussions occur. Helmets cannot protect against them because they are simply a byproduct of football. Due to the physicality of the sports, concussion or other head injuries are inevitable. For this to be changed the whole sport in its entirety will have to be changed (Bachynski, Goldberg, 2014, p 323-333). But the choice to play football, in the end, is left to the families and the players themselves. If football is a sport they want to pursue, that is fine.

See also
 Share your views on sports-related concussions with Wikiversity
Concussions in American football 
Concussions in sports

References 

Sports injuries
Sports controversies
Concussions